Acacia amanda is a shrub in the genus Acacia that is native to Northern Territory.

Description
Acacia amanda is an erect, often multi-stemmed shrub which grows from 0.4–2 m high. Its branchlets are smooth, and have a waxy bloom. The dull grey green phyllodes are narrowly elliptic, straight to strongly recurved, and 38–124 mm long by 8–36 mm wide, and have three main nerves. The inflorescences are simple or racemose with the raceme axes 75–180 mm long on  peduncles 15–35 mm long with 1–3 per axil. The  heads are globular with 35–53 flowers,  and golden. Flowers are 5-merous and have free sepals. The pods are narrow with the seeds raising the pods prominently and they are straight and 42–110 mm long by  7–13 mm wide and are papery and thin. The seeds are  without arils and 6–7.5 mm long,  and a dull, dark brown or black.

It is found along seasonal creek lines and clay flats downstream from the Koolpin gorge.

It flowers from May to November.

Taxonomy
The species was first formally described by the botanist Gregory John Leach in 2001.https://species.wikimedia.org/wiki/Gregory_John_Leach It was reclassified as Racosperma amanda in 2003 and then transferred back to the genus Acacia in 2006.

Distribution
It is endemic to a small area on the Arnhem Plateau, in Kakadu.

Etymology
The specific epithet comes from Amanda, the first name of the wife of the species author.

See also
 List of Acacia species

References

amanda
Flora of the Northern Territory
Plants described in 2001